Howard "Touchdown" Turner (October 13, 1922 – November 2, 2004) was a Canadian football player who played for the Ottawa Rough Riders. He won the Grey Cup with them in 1951. He previously played football for and attended North Carolina State University. He died in 2004.

References

1922 births
Ottawa Rough Riders players
2004 deaths
Sportspeople from Rocky Mount, North Carolina
North Carolina State University alumni
Players of American football from North Carolina
Canadian expatriates in the United States